Lara Arruabarrena and Andreja Klepač were the defending champions, but Arruabarrena chose not to participate this year and Klepač chose to compete in Tokyo instead.

Kirsten Flipkens and Johanna Larsson won the title, defeating Akiko Omae and Peangtarn Plipuech in the final, 6–2, 6–3.

Seeds

Draw

References 
 Draw

Korea Open - Doubles
2016 Doubles